The Sogamoso Dam is a concrete-face rock-fill dam on the Sogamoso River in northern Colombia.
Construction on the dam began in February 2009 and its first 273 MW Francis turbine-generator was commissioned on 1 December 2014. The other two generators were operational by 20 December 2014. The US$1.74 billion dam and power plant is owned by ISAGEN. INGETEC designed the dam in the 1990s and Impreglio was awarded the contract for construction.

The power plant houses four  Francis turbine-generators. Its spillway is located on its left bank and controlled by four radial gates. The dam has been the subject of protests among locals as it relocated 160 families and negatively impact the livelihood of miners within the reservoir zone and fishers downstream. Relocation of the residents, construction of a new bridges and roads will cost US$202 million.

See also

List of tallest dams in the world
List of power stations in Colombia

References

External links
Sogamoso Hydroelectric Project at ISAGEN

Dams in Colombia
Hydroelectric power stations in Colombia
Concrete-face rock-fill dams
Buildings and structures in Santander Department
Dams completed in 2014
2014 establishments in Colombia
Energy infrastructure completed in 2014